The Hilltopper Sports Network is the regional sports radio network for the Western Kentucky University's Hilltoppers and Lady Toppers. Headquartered in Bowling Green, Kentucky, the network provides coverage of WKU's athletic teams football, men's and women's basketball. Some select affiliates also clears WKU Men's Baseball games. The network boasts the second-largest radio network in the Commonwealth of Kentucky, behind only their main competitor, the UK IMG Sports Network.

WKYU-TV, the university-owned PBS member station, is the sole television affiliate that broadcasts WKU's televised coaches shows, along with some of WKU's sporting events, including those that originate from Sinclair Broadcasting-owned Stadium. In addition, some men's and women's basketball games are presented by WKYU with the Fox College Sports cablecast of the game, with the radio network's audio, broadcasting under the branding, "Hilltopper Sports Satellite Network."

Radio affiliates

Former affiliates 
Bardstown -- WBRT AM 1340 (2005-200?) 
Bowling Green -- WBGN AM 1340 (1950?-199?) original flagship station 
Brandenburg -- WMMG-AM/FM 1140AM/103.5FM (went defunct in case of 1140 AM)
Columbia -- WAIN AM 1270 (2005-200?) 
Elizabethtown -- WQXE FM (1969-197?) 
Glasgow -- WCLU AM 1490 (196?-198?)
Morgantown -- WLBQ AM 1570 (200?-2007?) 
Lewisport/Owensboro -- WLME 102.7
Princeton -- WPKY AM 1580

See also
Western Kentucky Hilltoppers and Lady Toppers 
WKYU-TV
Hilltopper Sports Satellite Network

References

External links
WKU Athletics Official Website

   

Western Kentucky University
Sports radio networks in the United States
Sports in Bowling Green, Kentucky
College basketball on the radio in the United States
College football on the radio
Learfield IMG College sports radio networks